The Pennsylvania Railroad (PRR) A3 was an 0-4-0 class steam locomotive that were built at Altoona Works between 1895 until 1905. A3s were used to shunt and sort out railroad cars at various PRR yards. Later, some A3s were converted to A3a, which had saddle tanks. The A3s were retired by 1920s, when the railroad introduced the much stronger A5s. All locomotives of the A3 class were scrapped.

External links
 Image of an A3
    

A3
0-4-0 locomotives
Steam locomotives of the United States
Standard gauge locomotives of the United States
Railway locomotives introduced in 1895
Scrapped locomotives
Shunting locomotives